Gardberg Site (Gardbergfeltet) is an archaeological site located east of the Einang Sound in the municipality of Vestre Slidre, Oppland County, Norway.
 
Gardberg consists of several burial cairns and clearance cairns as well as areas of early industry and farming. It is the location of about 550 burial mounds dating from the Roman Iron Age and the Viking Era.  Investigations have established that the site was inhabited from the Stone Age. Situated on one of the bigger burial mounds is the  Einang stone (Einangsteinen), estimated to c. AD 300.

The attraction is located in the traditional district of Valdres  and is managed by the Valdres Museum in Fagernes.

References

External links
Gardbergfeltet historical site at Valdres Museum

Archaeological sites in Norway
Former populated places in Norway